Autobiography of a Family Photo is a 1995 book by Jacqueline Woodson.  The book covers childhood, the growth of dark emotional and sexual tension, and the terrors of war.

References 

1995 American novels
Novels by Jacqueline Woodson